The 1990 Czechoslovak presidential election was held on 5 July 1990. Václav Havel was elected for his second term. Havel was the only candidate. Slovak National Party intended to nominate Štefan Kvietik who declined to run.

References

Presidential
1990